Kolowr (Kolour; Tati: , Kelur) is a city in Shahrud District of Khalkhal County, Ardabil province, in northwestern Iran. It is located in the Alborz (Elburz) mountain range. At the 2006 census, its population was 2,380 in 675 households. The following census in 2011 counted 2,347 people in 784 households. The latest census in 2016 showed a population of 2,347 people in 784 households. The native language in Kolowr and other areas of Shahrud District is Tati.

Tageo.com

References 

Khalkhal County

Cities in Ardabil Province

Towns and villages in Khalkhal County

Populated places in Ardabil Province

Populated places in Khalkhal County

Settled areas of Elburz